Bal Naren is an upcoming Indian Hindi-language film starring Yagya Bhasin, Bidita Bag, Rajneesh Duggal, Govind Namdev, Vindu Dara Singh, and Lokesh Mittal. The film is written and directed by Pawan Nagpal and produced by Deepak Mukut. The film was scheduled to release on 14 October 2022 but postponed. now the film is set to release on 11 November 2022.

Cast 
Yagya Bhasin as Naren (central character)
 Bidita Bag
Rajneesh Duggall
Govind Namdev
Vindu Dara Singh
Lokesh Mittal
Jitender Gaur

Plot 
The film is inspired by the Swachh Bharat Abhiyan and the importance of cleanliness during the pandemic. The idea of cleanliness and how a 14-year-old boy with his determination and efforts stopped his village from getting any case of corona virus.

Soundtrack

Track list

References

External links 
 

2022 films
Indian drama films
2020s Hindi-language films